Ladislav Žemla (6 November 1887 – 18 June 1955) was a Czech tennis player. He competed for Bohemia at the 1906, 1908 and 1912 Summer Olympics and for Czechoslovakia at the 1920 and 1924 Summer Olympics. At the 1920 Olympics, he won a bronze medal in the mixed doubles event, together with his wife Milada Skrbková. He also won a bronze medal at the 1906 Intercalated Games, playing with his brother Zdeněk Žemla.

References

External links

 
 

1887 births
1955 deaths
Czech male tennis players
Czechoslovak male tennis players
Olympic tennis players of Bohemia
Olympic tennis players of Czechoslovakia
Olympic bronze medalists for Czechoslovakia
Olympic medalists in tennis
Medalists at the 1906 Intercalated Games
Medalists at the 1920 Summer Olympics
Tennis players at the 1906 Intercalated Games
Tennis players at the 1908 Summer Olympics
Tennis players at the 1912 Summer Olympics
Tennis players at the 1920 Summer Olympics
Tennis players at the 1924 Summer Olympics
People from Tachov District
Sportspeople from the Plzeň Region